Songs of Love and Heartache is the sixth greatest hits compilation album by American country artist Alan Jackson. It was released in the United States on November 2, 2009 on the Arista Nashville and Cracker Barrel labels. The album itself consists of 12 songs, which includes 7 singles, 3 album tracks, and 2 previously unreleased songs.

Critical reception

Stephen Thomas Erlewine of AllMusic writes, "Released exclusively through Cracker Barrel, the 2009 compilation Songs of Love & Heartache delivers upon its title's promise, serving up 12 tunes of romance won and lost, including two perfectly fine previously unreleased cuts."

Track listing

Track information and credits verified from Discogs and the album's liner notes.

Charts and certifications
Songs of Love and Heartache debuted at number 34 on the US Billboard 200 for the week of November 21, 2009, where it stayed for one week.

Charts

References

2009 compilation albums
Alan Jackson compilation albums
Arista Records compilation albums
Cracker Barrel albums